Bořanovice is a municipality and village in Prague-East District in the Central Bohemian Region of the Czech Republic. It has about 900 inhabitants.

Administrative parts
The village of Pakoměřice is an administrative part of Bořanovice.

History
The first written mention of Bořanovice is from 1227. Pakoměřice was first documented in 1352, when the church was mentioned.

Sights
In Pakoměřice there is the complex of a rural castle with the Church of the Nativity of the Virgin Mary. The church was originally a Gothic building, later baroque rebuilt. The castle was originally a medieval fortress which underwent renaissance, baroque and neoclassical modifications.

Gallery

References

External links

 (in Czech)

Villages in Prague-East District